The 1912 Cork Senior Hurling Championship was the 25th staging of the Cork Senior Hurling Championship since its establishment by the Cork County Board in 1887. The draw for the opening round fixtures took place on 13 March 1912. The championship began on 14 April 1912 and ended on 29 September 1912.

Blackrock were the defending champions.

On 29 September 1912, Blackrock won the championship following a 4-02 to 0-01 defeat of Redmonds in the final. This was their 13th championship title overall and their third title in succession.

Results

First round

Second round

Semi-finals

Final

References

Cork Senior Hurling Championship
Cork Senior Hurling Championship